Audio Random Access (commonly abbreviated to ARA) is an extension for audio plug-in interfaces, such as AU, VST and RTAS, allowing them to exchange a greater amount of audio information with digital audio workstation (DAW) software. It was developed in a collaboration between Celemony Software and PreSonus.

Functionality 
ARA increases the amount of communication possible between DAW software and a plug-in, allowing them to exchange important information, such as audio data, tempo, pitch, and rhythm, for an entire song, rather than just at the moment of playback.

This increased amount of information exchange, and availability of data from other points in time, removes the need for audio material to be transferred to & from the plug-in, allowing that plug-in to be used as a more closely integrated part of the DAW's overall interface.

History 
ARA was developed as a joint effort between Celemony Software and PreSonus, driven by the desire to increase the level of integration between Celemony's Melodyne plug-in and the DAWs using it. It was first published in October 2011 and released as part of PreSonus' Studio One DAW (version 2) and Melodyne (Editor, Assistant and Essential versions 1.3).

Version 2 of ARA was announced during NAMM in January 2018, introducing new features such as the simultaneous editing of multiple tracks, transfer of chord track information, and undo synchronization with the DAW. DAWs which use ARA version 2 are not automatically backwards compatible with plug-ins using version 1. The first DAWs to support ARA version 2 were Logic Pro X (version 10.4, released in January 2018) and Studio One (version 4, released in May 2018).

ARA implementation 
To allow software manufacturers to support ARA, a Software Development Kit has been published by Celemony.

Current software products which support ARA include the following.

Digital audio workstations

Audio editors and plug-ins

See also 
 Celemony Software
 PreSonus
Studio One (software)
 Audio plug-in

References

External links
 Celemony's Tech Talk video 
 ARA in Studio One
 ARA in Sonar X3
 ARA 2 in Apple Logic Pro X 10.4
 Auto-Align Post 2
 Video Covering Acoustica 7.4 with ARA2 support

Music software plugin architectures